Maccullochella is a genus of large Australian predatory freshwater fish within the family Percichthyidae. The genus Maccullochella was named after an early Australian fish researcher with the surname McCulloch.

The Maccullochella species are called 'cod' in the vernacular.

At the time of European settlement of Australia, members of the genus Maccullochella dominated the Murray-Darling river system (Murray cod, M. peelii, and trout cod, M. macquariensis) and 4 East Coast river systems (eastern freshwater cod, M. ikei, of the Clarence and Richmond Rivers, Brisbane River cod, Maccullochella sp., and Mary River cod, M. mariensis).

As large, long-lived, top-order predators with delayed sexual maturity and relatively low fecundity (fertility) Maccullochella species are extremely vulnerable to overfishing, siltation and other forms of habitat degradation, and river regulation by dams and weirs that alter river environments and negatively affect spawning and recruitment (survival) of young fish.

The Maccullochella species have not fared well since European settlement.  All are endangered or critically endangered except for Murray cod, which are considered 'Threatened' and 'Vulnerable' under national and state legislation.  There are grave concerns over the future of wild Murray cod now, just as much as there is for all the Maccullochella species.

Species
There are currently four recognized species in this genus:
 Maccullochella ikei Rowland, 1986 (Eastern freshwater cod)
 Maccullochella macquariensis (G. Cuvier, 1829) (Trout cod)
 Maccullochella mariensis Rowland, 1993 (Mary River cod)
 Maccullochella peelii (T. L. Mitchell, 1838) (Murray cod)

Etymology
The generic name honours the Australian zoologist Allan Riverstone McCulloch (1885-1925) who Whitley succeeded as the Curator of Fishes at the Australian Museum.

References

 
Freshwater fish genera
Taxa named by Gilbert Percy Whitley 
Extant Miocene first appearances